Augusto is an Italian, Portuguese, and Spanish given name or surname.
Derived from Augustus, meaning in Latin "majestic," "the increaser," or "venerable", it is notable as being the name of the first emperor of Ancient Rome. The Greek translation of the title Augustus was Sebastos, from which the name Sebastian descends.

Notable people with the name include:

Augusto Aníbal
Augusto dos Anjos
Augusto Arbizo
Augusto Barbera (born 1938), Italian law professor, politician and judge
Augusto Benedico
Augusto Boal
Augusto de Campos
Augusto César Sandino
Augusto Fantozzi 
Augusto Genina
Augusto B. Leguía
Augusto Monterroso
Augusto Odone, Italian economist who invented Lorenzo's oil
Augusto Pestana (1868-1934)
Augusto Pinochet
Augusto Righi
Augusto Roa Bastos
Augusto Silj
Augusto Vargas Alzamora
Augusto de Vasconcelos
Augusto Vera

People in sports
Augusto (footballer, born 1992), Brazilian football player, full name Augusto Bruno da Silva
Augusto Farfus, Brazilian race car driver
Augusto Fernández, Argentine footballer
Augusto Franqui, Cuban baseball player
Augusto Inácio, Portuguese footballer
Augusto Oliveira da Silva Brazilian footballer
Luís Augusto Osório Romão (1983) Brazilian footballer
César Augusto Ramírez, Paraguayan footballer
José Augusto de Almeida, Portuguese footballer
José Augusto Torres, Portuguese footballer
Renato Soares de Oliveira Augusto (1988) Brazilian footballer
Zé Augusto, Portuguese footballer

Other
Estádio Augusto Bauer, a football (soccer) stadium located in Brusque, Brazil

See also
August (name)
Augustus (disambiguation)
Agosto (disambiguation)
Auguste

Italian masculine given names
Portuguese masculine given names
Spanish masculine given names